Boussac is a commune in the Creuse department in the Nouvelle-Aquitaine region in central France. The famous Lady and the Unicorn Tapestries (c. 1500) were discovered in 1841 in Boussac castle. In 1844 the novelist George Sand saw them and brought public attention to the tapestries in her works at the time (most notably in her novel Jeanne), in which she correctly dated them to the end of the fifteenth century, using the ladies' costumes for reference. In 1863 they were bought by the Musée de Cluny in Paris where they are still on display.

Geography

Population

Personalities
 Jean de Brosse, Marshal of France, lived and died here
 Pierre Leroux (1797–1871), philosopher, friend of George Sand was mayor here in 1848
 George Sand (1804–1878), set her romance Jeanne here in 1836

Sights
 The church of St. Anne, dating from the fifteenth century
 The twelfth-century castle
 The remains of the old town ramparts
 Several ancient houses and the river bridge, all from the fifteenth century

See also
Communes of the Creuse department

References

External links
Official website of the commune 

Communes of Creuse
Berry, France